Hugo Johansson (19 April 1888 – 16 May 1969) was a Swedish wrestler. He competed in the featherweight event at the 1912 Summer Olympics. He won the silver medal at the 1913 World Wrestling Championships.

References

External links
 

1888 births
1969 deaths
Olympic wrestlers of Sweden
Wrestlers at the 1912 Summer Olympics
Swedish male sport wrestlers
Sportspeople from Malmö